Shannon A. Chakraborty (born December 7, 1985) is an American historical fantasy and speculative fiction writer based in Queens, best known for The Daevabad Trilogy.

Literary career 
Chakraborty's debut novel, The City of Brass, was highly acclaimed when it debuted in 2017 and was a finalist for several science fiction and fantasy awards, including the Crawford Award, Compton Crook Award, Locus Award, British Fantasy Award, World Fantasy Award, and won the Booknest.eu award for best Debut Novel. The sequel, The Kingdom of Copper, was published to critical acclaim in 2019, and later that year she was named a finalist for the John W. Campbell Award. The final installment in the Daevabad trilogy, The Empire of Gold, was released in June 2020. The River of Silver, a collection of stories taking place in Daevabad, is set to come out in 2022.

It was announced that Chakraborty's next trilogy will be set in the 12th-century Indian Ocean, pitched as Ocean's Eleven meets Pirates of the Caribbean, in which an infamous, retired pirate returns to her old profession when she is offered the chance to right a wrong from her past and gain a fabled treasure. The series will debut in 2022 and be published by Voyager.

Adaptations 
In May 2020, it was announced that Complete Fiction, a film and television company, will be developing The Daevabad Trilogy as a series for Netflix.

Personal life

Chakraborty was born and raised in New Jersey to Catholic parents and converted to Islam in her teens. "Chakraborty" is her married name. She originally intended to be a historian specializing in the Middle East; however, the financial crisis around 2008 derailed those plans, so while she worked to support herself and her husband, she also kept herself occupied by writing what she called "historical fan fiction", that later became her first novel, The City of Brass.

She lives in New Jersey with her husband and daughter.

Bibliography

The Daevabad Trilogy

 The City of Brass (2017) 
 The Kingdom of Copper (2019) 
 The Empire of Gold (2020)

Short fiction

 "The Djinn" (2011) (as S. Ali), published in Expanded Horizons issue 29, June 2011
 "Yerushalom" (2011) (as S. Ali), published in Crossed Genres issue 31, July 2011
 "Bilaadi" (2012) (as S. Ali), published in The Future Fire February 2012

References

1985 births
Living people
American fantasy writers
21st-century American novelists
American Muslims
Converts to Islam from Roman Catholicism
Writers from New Jersey
American women novelists
Women science fiction and fantasy writers
21st-century American women writers